The Japanese National Road Race Championships are conducted every year under the auspices of the Japan Cycling Federation.

Men

Men's Road Race

U23

Women

See also
Japanese National Time Trial Championships

References

External links
 Japan Cycling Federation (in Japanese)

National road cycling championships
Cycle races in Japan
Recurring sporting events established in 1998
1998 establishments in Japan